European route E 574 is a road part of the International E-road network.
It begins in Bacău, Bacău County, Romania and ends in Craiova, Dolj County, Romania.

Route and E-road junctions
  (on shared signage  DN11 then  DN73A then  then  DN65)
 Bacău:  
 Chichiș:  
 Braşov:  , 
 Piteşti:  , 
 Craiova:

References
E574 on OpenStreetMap

External links 
 UN Economic Commission for Europe: Overall Map of E-road Network (2007)
 International E-road network

699671
Roads in Romania